In mathematics, the pseudospectrum of an operator is a set containing the spectrum of the operator and the numbers that are "almost" eigenvalues. Knowledge of the pseudospectrum can be particularly useful for understanding non-normal operators and their eigenfunctions.

The ε-pseudospectrum of a matrix A consists of all eigenvalues of matrices which are ε-close to A:

Numerical algorithms which calculate the eigenvalues of a matrix give only approximate results due to rounding and other errors. These errors can be described with the matrix E.

where we use the convention that  if  is not invertible.

References 

 Lloyd N. Trefethen and Mark Embree: "Spectra And Pseudospectra: The Behavior of Nonnormal Matrices And Operators", Princeton Univ. Press,  (2005).
 Pseudospectra Gateway / Embree and Trefethen 

Numerical linear algebra
Spectral theory